Workers' Party was a Czech far-right, extremist and neo-Nazi party in the Czech Republic. The party was founded by Tomáš Vandas. In 2010 the party was banned, making it the first instance of banning a party for its ideology in the modern history of the Czech Republic. The party was transformed into a "Party of Citizens of the Czech Republic", later renamed to Workers' Party of Social Justice.

Election results

European Parliament

References

Political parties established in 2003
Political parties disestablished in 2010
Banned far-right parties
2003 establishments in the Czech Republic
2004 establishments in the Czech Republic
Anti-Romanyist parties in the Czech Republic
Anti-Zionist political parties in the Czech Republic
Nationalist parties in the Czech Republic
Neo-Nazi political parties in Europe
Far-right political parties in the Czech Republic
Workers' Party of Social Justice